This is a list of Australian plant species authored by Robert Brown, including naturalised species:

A

Abroma fastuosa R.Br.
Acacia alata R.Br.
Acacia biflora R.Br.
Acacia melanoxylon R.Br.
Acacia nigricans (Labill.) R.Br.
Acacia pubescens (Vent.) R.Br.
Acacia pulchella R.Br.
Acacia sulcata R.Br.
Achyranthes arborescens R.Br.
Acianthus caudatus R.Br.
Acianthus exsertus R.Br.
Acianthus fornicatus R.Br.
Acidonia microcarpa (R.Br.) L.A.S.Johnson & B.G.Briggs
Acrotriche aggregata R.Br.
Acrotriche cordata (Labill.) R.Br.
Acrotriche depressa R.Br.
Acrotriche divaricata R.Br.
Acrotriche patula R.Br.
Acrotriche ramiflora R.Br.
Acrotriche serrulata R.Br.
Adenanthos apiculatus R.Br.
Adenanthos terminalis R.Br.
Adenosma caerulea R.Br.
Adiantum formosum R.Br.
Aegialitis annulata R.Br.
Agastachys odorata R.Br.
Agrostis parviflora R.Br.
Agrostis plebeia R.Br.
Agrostocrinum scabrum (R.Br.) Baill.
Ajuga australis R.Br.
Ajuga sinuata R.Br.
Alloteropsis semialata (R.Br.) Hitchc.
Alpinia caerulea (R.Br.) Benth.
Alstonia scholaris (L.) R.Br.
Alstonia spectabilis R.Br.
Alternanthera angustifolia R.Br.
Alternanthera denticulata R.Br.
Alternanthera nana R.Br.
Alternanthera nodiflora R.Br.
Alternanthera sessilis (L.) R.Br. ex DC.
Alyxia buxifolia R.Br.
Alyxia obtusifolia R.Br.
Alyxia ruscifolia R.Br.
Alyxia spicata R.Br.
Amaranthus interruptus R.Br.
Ammobium alatum R.Br.
Amphipogon avenaceus R.Br.
Amphipogon debilis R.Br.
Amphipogon laguroides R.Br.
Amphipogon setaceus (R.Br.) T.D.Macfarl.
Amphipogon strictus R.Br.
Amphipogon turbinatus R.Br.
Anarthria gracilis R.Br.
Anarthria laevis R.Br.
Anarthria prolifera R.Br.
Anarthria scabra R.Br.
Ancistrachne uncinulata (R.Br.) S.T.Blake
Andersonia caerulea R.Br.
Andersonia micrantha R.Br.
Andersonia parvifolia R.Br.
Andersonia sprengelioides R.Br.
Aneilema acuminatum R.Br.
Aneilema biflorum R.Br.
Aneilema siliculosum R.Br.
Anisomeles malabarica (L.) R.Br. ex Sims
Anisomeles salviifolia R.Br.
Anisopogon avenaceus R.Br.
Anthobolus filifolius R.Br.
Anthocercis viscosa R.Br.
Anthotium humile R.Br.
Anzybas unguiculatus (R.Br.) D.L.Jones & M.A.Clem.
Aphelia cyperoides R.Br.
Apostasia wallichii R.Br. ex Wall.
Aristida calycina R.Br.
Aristida hygrometrica R.Br.
Aristida ramosa R.Br.
Aristolochia pubera R.Br.
Arthropodium cirratum (G.Forst.) R.Br.
Arthropodium fimbriatum R.Br.
Arthropodium minus R.Br.
Arthropodium strictum R.Br.
Arthrostylis aphylla R.Br.
Asplenium attenuatum R.Br.
Asplenium difforme R.Br.
Asplenium paleaceum R.Br.
Astelia alpina R.Br.
Astroloma compactum R.Br.
Astroloma humifusum (Cav.) R.Br.
Astroloma pallidum R.Br.
Astroloma pinifolium (R.Br.) Benth.
Astroloma prostratum R.Br.
Astroloma tectum R.Br.
Atriplex paludosa R.Br.
Atriplex pumilio R.Br.
Atriplex semibaccata R.Br.
Austrocynoglossum latifolium (R.Br.) Popov ex R.R.Mill
Austrodanthonia pilosa (R.Br.) H.P.Linder
Austrodanthonia racemosa (R.Br.) H.P.Linder
Austrodanthonia setacea (R.Br.) H.P.Linder
Austrostipa compressa (R.Br.) S.W.L.Jacobs & J.Everett
Austrostipa mollis (R.Br.) S.W.L.Jacobs & J.Everett
Austrostipa pubescens (R.Br.) S.W.L.Jacobs & J.Everett
Austrostipa semibarbata (R.Br.) S.W.L.Jacobs & J.Everett
Austrostipa setacea (R.Br.) S.W.L.Jacobs & J.Everett
Azolla pinnata R.Br.

B

Bacopa floribunda (R.Br.) Wettst.
Baloskion australe (R.Br.) B.G.Briggs & L.A.S.Johnson
Baloskion gracile (R.Br.) B.G.Briggs & L.A.S.Johnson
Baloskion pallens (R.Br.) B.G.Briggs & L.A.S.Johnson
Banksia aemula R.Br.
Banksia attenuata R.Br.
Banksia baueri R.Br.
Banksia baxteri R.Br.
Banksia brownii Baxter ex R.Br.
Banksia caleyi R.Br.
Banksia coccinea R.Br.
Banksia goodii R.Br.
Banksia ilicifolia R.Br.
Banksia littoralis R.Br.
Banksia media R.Br.
Banksia menziesii R.Br.
Banksia nutans R.Br.
Banksia occidentalis R.Br.
Banksia paludosa R.Br.
Banksia pulchella R.Br.
Banksia quercifolia R.Br.
Banksia solandri R.Br.
Banksia speciosa R.Br.
Banksia sphaerocarpa R.Br.
Banksia verticillata R.Br.
Barringtonia calyptrata (R.Br. ex Miers) R.Br. ex F.M.Bailey
Baumea articulata (R.Br.) S.T.Blake
Baumea juncea (R.Br.) Palla
Baumea teretifolia (R.Br.) Palla
Beaufortia decussata R.Br.
Beaufortia sparsa R.Br.
Bellendena montana R.Br.
Blandfordia grandiflora R.Br.
Blechnum fluviatile (R.Br.) Lowe ex Salomon
Blechnum minus (R.Br.) Ettingsh.
Blechnum patersonii (R.Br.) Mett.
Blennodia canescens R.Br.
Blumea diffusa R.Br. ex Benth.
Boerhavia mutabilis R.Br.
Bonamia linearis (R.Br.) Hallier f.
Bonamia media (R.Br.) Hallier f.
Bonamia pannosa (R.Br.) Hallier f.
Boronia albiflora R.Br. ex Benth.
Borya sphaerocephala R.Br.
Bossiaea cinerea R.Br.
Bossiaea dentata (R.Br.) Benth.
Bossiaea linophylla R.Br.
Bossiaea prostrata R.Br.
Bossiaea rufa R.Br.
Botrychium australe R.Br.
Brachyachne tenella (R.Br.) C.E.Hubb.
Brachychiton diversifolius R.Br.
Brachychiton incanus R.Br.
Brachychiton populneus (Schott & Endl.) R.Br.
Brachyloma ciliatum (R.Br.) Benth.
Brunonia australis Sm. ex R.Br.
Brunoniella acaulis (R.Br.) Bremek.
Brunoniella pumilio (R.Br.) Bremek.
Buchnera asperata R.Br.
Buchnera gracilis R.Br.
Buchnera linearis R.Br.
Buchnera ramosissima R.Br.
Buchnera tenella R.Br.
Buchnera tetragona R.Br.
Buchnera urticifolia R.Br.
Bulbine bulbosa (R.Br.) Haw.
Bulbine semibarbata (R.Br.) Haw.
Burchardia umbellata R.Br.
Burmannia juncea R.Br.

C

Caesia occidentalis R.Br.
Caesia parviflora R.Br.
Caladenia alata R.Br.
Caladenia carnea R.Br.
Caladenia congesta R.Br.
Caladenia filamentosa R.Br.
Caladenia flava R.Br.
Caladenia gracilis R.Br.
Caladenia latifolia R.Br.
Caladenia patersonii R.Br.
Caladenia testacea R.Br.
Caleana major R.Br.
Caleana minor R.Br.
Calectasia cyanea R.Br.
Callicarpa pedunculata R.Br.
Callistemon rigidus R.Br.
Calochilus campestris R.Br.
Calochilus paludosus R.Br.
Calochlaena dubia (R.Br.) M.D.Turner & R.A.White
Calostemma purpureum R.Br.
Calothamnus gracilis R.Br.
Calothamnus quadrifidus R.Br.
Calothamnus villosus R.Br.
Calotis cuneifolia R.Br.
Calotis dentex R.Br.
Calystegia sepium (L.) R.Br.
Canscora diffusa (Vahl) R.Br. ex Roem. & Schult.
Capillipedium parviflorum (R.Br.) Stapf
Capparis lasiantha R.Br. ex DC.
Capparis lucida (DC.) R.Br. ex Benth.
Carex appressa R.Br.
Carex breviculmis R.Br.
Carex cataractae R.Br.
Carex chlorantha R.Br.
Carex inversa R.Br.
Carex inversa R.Br. f. inversa
Carissa lanceolata R.Br.
Carissa ovata R.Br.
Carpha alpina R.Br.
Cartonema spicatum R.Br.
Cassinia aculeata (Labill.) R.Br.
Cassinia arcuata R.Br.
Cassinia denticulata R.Br.
Cassinia laevis R.Br.
Cassinia longifolia R.Br.
Cassinia quinquefaria R.Br.
Cassytha glabella R.Br.
Cassytha glabella R.Br. f. glabella
Cassytha melantha R.Br.
Cassytha pubescens R.Br.
Caustis dioica R.Br.
Caustis flexuosa R.Br.
Caustis pentandra R.Br.
Cenchrus australis R.Br.
Centranthera hispida R.Br.
Centrolepis aristata (R.Br.) Roem. & Schult.
Centrolepis banksii (R.Br.) Roem. & Schult.
Centrolepis exserta (R.Br.) Roem. & Schult.
Centrolepis mutica (R.Br.) Hieron.
Centrolepis polygyna (R.Br.) Hieron.
Centrolepis pulvinata (R.Br.) Roem. & Schult.
Centrolepis pusilla (R.Br.) Roem. & Schult.
Centrolepis strigosa (R.Br.) Roem. & Schult.
Chaetanthus aristatus (R.Br.) B.G.Briggs & L.A.S.Johnson
Chaetanthus leptocarpoides R.Br.
Chamaeraphis hordeacea R.Br.
Chamaescilla corymbosa (R.Br.) F.Muell. ex Benth.
Cheilanthes caudata R.Br.
Cheilanthes distans (R.Br.) Mett.
Cheilanthes nitida (R.Br.) P.S.Green
Cheilanthes nudiuscula (R.Br.) T.Moore
Cheilanthes pumilio (R.Br.) F.Muell.
Chenopodium carinatum R.Br.
Chenopodium erosum R.Br.
Chenopodium pumilio R.Br.
Chiloglottis diphylla R.Br.
Chiloterus gibbosus (R.Br.) D.L.Jones & M.A.Clem.
Chionanthus axillaris R.Br.
Chloanthes glandulosa R.Br.
Chloanthes stoechadis R.Br.
Chloris divaricata R.Br.
Chloris pumilio R.Br.
Chloris truncata R.Br.
Chloris ventricosa R.Br.
Chlorophytum laxum R.Br.
Chordifex crispatus (R.Br.) B.G.Briggs & L.A.S.Johnson
Chordifex dimorphus (R.Br.) B.G.Briggs
Chordifex fastigiatus (R.Br.) B.G.Briggs
Chordifex laxus (R.Br.) B.G.Briggs & L.A.S.Johnson
Chordifex monocephalus (R.Br.) B.G.Briggs
Chordifex sphacelatus (R.Br.) B.G.Briggs & L.A.S.Johnson
Choretrum glomeratum R.Br.
Choretrum lateriflorum R.Br.
Chorizandra cymbaria R.Br.
Chorizandra sphaerocephala R.Br.
Chorizema rhombeum R.Br.
Chrysopogon pallidus (R.Br.) Steud.
Clematis aristata R.Br. ex Ker Gawl.
Clerodendrum costatum R.Br.
Clerodendrum floribundum R.Br.
Clerodendrum tomentosum (Vent.) R.Br.
Coelachne pulchella R.Br.
Commelina cyanea R.Br.
Commelina ensifolia R.Br.
Commelina lanceolata R.Br.
Commelina undulata R.Br.
Conospermum caeruleum R.Br.
Conospermum capitatum R.Br.
Conospermum distichum R.Br.
Conospermum flexuosum R.Br.
Conospermum huegelii R.Br. ex Endl.
Conospermum petiolare R.Br.
Conospermum tenuifolium R.Br.
Conospermum teretifolium R.Br.
Conospermum triplinervium R.Br.
Conostylis aculeata R.Br.
Conostylis breviscapa R.Br.
Conostylis serrulata R.Br.
Conostylis setigera R.Br.
Convolvulus angustissimus R.Br.
Convolvulus remotus R.Br.
Coopernookia barbata (R.Br.) Carolin
Corchorus pumilio R.Br. ex Benth.
Cordyline cannifolia R.Br.
Corybas fimbriatus (R.Br.) Rchb.f.
Corymbia grandifolia (R.Br. ex Benth.) K.D.Hill & L.A.S.Johnson
Corynotheca lateriflora (R.Br.) F.Muell. ex Benth.
Cosmelia rubra R.Br.
Crepidomanes venosum (R.Br.) Bostock
Crinum angustifolium R.Br.
Crinum pedunculatum R.Br.
Crinum venosum R.Br.
Crotalaria cunninghamii R.Br.
Cryptocarya glaucescens R.Br.
Cryptocarya obovata R.Br.
Cryptocarya triplinervis R.Br.
Cryptostegia grandiflora Roxb. ex R.Br.
Cryptostylis erecta R.Br.
Cryptostylis ovata R.Br.
Culcita dubia (R.Br.) Maxon
Curculigo ensifolia R.Br.
Cuscuta australis R.Br.
Cyanicula caerulea (R.Br.) Hopper & A.P.Br.
Cyanicula deformis (R.Br.) Hopper & A.P.Br.
Cyathea australis (R.Br.) Domin
Cyathochaeta avenacea (R.Br.) Benth.
Cyathochaeta clandestina (R.Br.) Benth.
Cyathochaeta diandra (R.Br.) Nees
Cyathodes dealbata R.Br.
Cyathodes straminea R.Br.
Cycas angulata R.Br.
Cycas media R.Br.
Cymbidium canaliculatum R.Br.
Cymbidium suave R.Br.
Cymbopogon bombycinus (R.Br.) Domin
Cymbopogon procerus (R.Br.) Domin
Cymbopogon refractus (R.Br.) A.Camus
Cymodocea serrulata (R.Br.) Asch. & Magnus
Cynanchum carnosum (R.Br.) Schltr.
Cynanchum floribundum R.Br.
Cynanchum pedunculatum R.Br.
Cynoglossum australe R.Br.
Cynoglossum suaveolens R.Br.
Cyperus alterniflorus R.Br.
Cyperus angustatus R.Br.
Cyperus aquatilis R.Br.
Cyperus breviculmis R.Br.
Cyperus carinatus R.Br.
Cyperus concinnus R.Br.
Cyperus conicus (R.Br.) Boeck.
Cyperus decompositus (R.Br.) F.Muell.
Cyperus enervis R.Br.
Cyperus flaccidus R.Br.
Cyperus fulvus R.Br.
Cyperus gracilis R.Br.
Cyperus holoschoenus R.Br.
Cyperus imbecillis R.Br.
Cyperus laevis R.Br.
Cyperus lucidus R.Br.
Cyperus microcephalus R.Br.
Cyperus ornatus R.Br.
Cyperus pedunculatus (R.Br.) J.H.Kern
Cyperus platystylis R.Br.
Cyperus pulchellus R.Br.
Cyperus scaber (R.Br.) Boeck.
Cyperus scariosus R.Br.
Cyperus sexflorus R.Br.
Cyperus sporobolus R.Br.
Cyperus subulatus R.Br.
Cyperus tetraphyllus R.Br.
Cyperus trinervis R.Br.
Cyperus unioloides R.Br.
Cyperus vaginatus R.Br.
Cyperus ventricosus R.Br.
Cyrtostylis reniformis R.Br.

D

Dactyloctenium radulans (R.Br.) P.Beauv.
Damasonium minus (R.Br.) Buchenau
Dampiera fasciculata R.Br.
Dampiera ferruginea R.Br.
Dampiera hederacea R.Br.
Dampiera incana R.Br.
Dampiera linearis R.Br.
Dampiera parvifolia R.Br.
Dampiera purpurea R.Br.
Dampiera stricta (Sm.) R.Br.
Danthonia longifolia R.Br.
Danthonia pauciflora R.Br.
Danthonia semiannularis (Labill.) R.Br.
Dapsilanthus elatior (R.Br.) B.G.Briggs & L.A.S.Johnson
Dapsilanthus ramosus (R.Br.) B.G.Briggs & L.A.S.Johnson
Dapsilanthus spathaceus (R.Br.) B.G.Briggs & L.A.S.Johnson
Dasypogon bromeliifolius R.Br.
Daviesia latifolia R.Br.
Daviesia mimosoides R.Br.
Daviesia teretifolia R.Br. ex Benth.
Deeringia arborescens (R.Br.) Druce
Dendrobium canaliculatum R.Br.
Dennstaedtia davallioides (R.Br.) T.Moore
Deplanchea tetraphylla (R.Br.) F.Muell.
Desmocladus fasciculatus (R.Br.) B.G.Briggs & L.A.S.Johnson
Desmocladus flexuosus (R.Br.) B.G.Briggs & L.A.S.Johnson
Deyeuxia decipiens (R.Br.) Vickery
Dianella congesta R.Br.
Dianella longifolia R.Br.
Dianella rara R.Br.
Dianella revoluta R.Br.
Diaspasis filifolia R.Br.
Dichanthium sericeum (R.Br.) A.Camus
Dichanthium tenue (R.Br.) A.Camus
Dichelachne rara (R.Br.) Vickery
Digitaria divaricatissima (R.Br.) Hughes
Digitaria gibbosa (R.Br.) P.Beauv.
Digitaria papposa (R.Br.) P.Beauv.
Digitaria parviflora (R.Br.) Hughes
Dillwynia cinerascens R.Br.
Dillwynia parvifolia R.Br. ex Sims
Dimeria acinaciformis R.Br.
Dioscorea transversa R.Br.
Diospyros australis (R.Br.) Hiern
Diospyros compacta (R.Br.) Kosterm.
Diospyros littorea (R.Br.) Kosterm.
Diplachne parviflora (R.Br.) Benth.
Diplazium australe (R.Br.) N.A.Wakef.
Dipodium punctatum (Sm.) R.Br.
Dipteracanthus bracteatus (R.Br.) Nees
Dischidia nummularia R.Br.
Dissocarpus paradoxus (R.Br.) Ulbr.
Diuris alba R.Br.
Diuris emarginata R.Br.
Diuris longifolia R.Br.
Diuris pauciflora R.Br.
Diuris pedunculata R.Br.
Diuris setacea R.Br.
Diuris sulphurea R.Br.
Dockrillia rigida (R.Br.) Rauschert
Dockrillia teretifolia (R.Br.) Brieger
Dolichandrone alternifolia (R.Br.) F.M.Bailey
Dolichandrone heterophylla (R.Br.) F.Muell.
Doodia aspera R.Br.
Doodia caudata (Cav.) R.Br.
Doodia media R.Br.
Dracophyllum secundum R.Br.
Drosera menziesii R.Br. ex DC.
Dryandra arctotidis R.Br.
Dryandra armata R.Br.
Dryandra baxteri R.Br.
Dryandra bipinnatifida R.Br.
Dryandra blechnifolia R.Br.
Dryandra calophylla R.Br.
Dryandra concinna R.Br.
Dryandra cuneata R.Br.
Dryandra falcata R.Br.
Dryandra foliolata R.Br.
Dryandra formosa R.Br.
Dryandra fraseri R.Br.
Dryandra longifolia R.Br.
Dryandra mucronulata R.Br.
Dryandra nervosa R.Br.
Dryandra nivea (Labill.) R.Br.
Dryandra obtusa R.Br.
Dryandra plumosa R.Br.
Dryandra pteridifolia R.Br.
Dryandra seneciifolia R.Br.
Dryandra serra R.Br.
Dryandra squarrosa R.Br.
Dryandra tenuifolia R.Br.
Drymophila cyanocarpa R.Br.
Duboisia myoporoides R.Br.
Dysphania littoralis R.Br.

E

Ectrosia leporina R.Br.
Ehretia acuminata R.Br.
Ehretia membranifolia R.Br.
Ehretia saligna R.Br.
Einadia hastata (R.Br.) A.J.Scott
Einadia nutans (R.Br.) A.J.Scott
Eleocharis acuta R.Br.
Eleocharis atricha R.Br.
Eleocharis gracilis R.Br.
Eleocharis pusilla R.Br.
Eleocharis sphacelata R.Br.
Elymus scaber (R.Br.) A.Love
Elymus scabrus (R.Br.) A.Love
Elyonurus citreus (R.Br.) Munro ex Benth.
Enchylaena tomentosa R.Br.
Endiandra glauca R.Br.
Enneapogon gracilis (R.Br.) P.Beauv.
Enneapogon nigricans (R.Br.) P.Beauv.
Enneapogon pallidus (R.Br.) P.Beauv.
Enneapogon purpurascens (R.Br.) P.Beauv.
Entolasia marginata (R.Br.) Hughes
Entolasia stricta (R.Br.) Hughes
Epacris crassifolia R.Br.
Epacris exserta R.Br.
Epacris microphylla R.Br.
Epacris mucronulata R.Br.
Epacris paludosa R.Br.
Epacris serpyllifolia R.Br.
Epacris sparsa R.Br.
Epiblema grandiflorum R.Br.
Eragrostis concinna (R.Br.) Steud.
Eragrostis leptostachya (R.Br.) Steud.
Eragrostis parviflora (R.Br.) Trin.
Eragrostis pubescens (R.Br.) Steud.
Eragrostis stenostachya (R.Br.) Steud.
Eremophila alternifolia R.Br.
Eremophila glabra (R.Br.) Ostenf.
Eremophila longifolia (R.Br.) F.Muell.
Eremophila oppositifolia R.Br.
Eremophila scoparia (R.Br.) F.Muell.
Eremophila sturtii R.Br.
Eriachne avenacea R.Br.
Eriachne capillaris R.Br.
Eriachne ciliata R.Br.
Eriachne glauca R.Br.
Eriachne mucronata R.Br.
Eriachne obtusa R.Br.
Eriachne pallescens R.Br.
Eriachne rara R.Br.
Eriachne squarrosa R.Br.
Eriocaulon australe R.Br.
Eriocaulon cinereum R.Br.
Eriocaulon depressum R.Br. ex Sm.
Eriocaulon nanum R.Br.
Eriocaulon nigricans R.Br.
Eriocaulon pallidum R.Br.
Eriocaulon pusillum R.Br.
Ervatamia orientalis (R.Br.) Domin
Ervatamia pubescens (R.Br.) Domin
Erythroxylum ellipticum R.Br. ex Benth.
Eucalyptus grandifolia R.Br. ex Benth.
Eucalyptus tetragona (R.Br.) F.Muell.
Euphrasia arguta R.Br.
Euphrasia collina R.Br.
Euphrasia scabra R.Br.
Euphrasia striata R.Br.
Eupomatia laurina R.Br.
Eurychorda complanata (R.Br.) B.G.Briggs & L.A.S.Johnson
Eustrephus latifolius R.Br. ex Ker Gawl.
Eutaxia microphylla (R.Br.) C.H.Wright & Dewar
Evandra aristata R.Br.
Evandra pauciflora R.Br.
Exocarpos aphyllus R.Br.
Exocarpos humifusus R.Br.
Exocarpos latifolius R.Br.
Exocarpos sparteus R.Br.
Exocarpos strictus R.Br.

F

Festuca plebeia R.Br.
Fimbristylis acicularis R.Br.
Fimbristylis caespitosa R.Br.
Fimbristylis cymosa R.Br.
Fimbristylis cyperoides R.Br.
Fimbristylis denudata R.Br.
Fimbristylis depauperata R.Br.
Fimbristylis furva R.Br.
Fimbristylis pauciflora R.Br.
Fimbristylis polytrichoides (Retz.) R.Br.
Fimbristylis pterigosperma R.Br.
Fimbristylis punctata R.Br.
Fimbristylis rara R.Br.
Fimbristylis sericea R.Br.
Fimbristylis spiralis R.Br.
Fimbristylis tetragona R.Br.
Fimbristylis tristachya R.Br.
Fimbristylis velata R.Br.
Fimbristylis xyridis R.Br.
Flindersia australis R.Br.
Franklandia fucifolia R.Br.
Fuirena arenosa R.Br.

G

Gahnia aspera (R.Br.) Spreng.
Gahnia decomposita (R.Br.) Benth.
Gahnia deusta (R.Br.) Benth.
Gahnia erythrocarpa R.Br.
Gahnia lanigera (R.Br.) Benth.
Gahnia melanocarpa R.Br.
Gahnia radula (R.Br.) Benth.
Gastrodia sesamoides R.Br.
Gastrolobium bilobum R.Br.
Gastrolobium latifolium (R.Br.) G.Chandler & Crisp
Gaultheria hispida R.Br.
Geitonoplesium cymosum (R.Br.) A.Cunn. ex R.Br.
Genoplesium baueri R.Br.
Gleichenia alpina R.Br.
Gleichenia dicarpa R.Br.
Gleichenia microphylla R.Br.
Gleichenia rupestris R.Br.
Glossodia major R.Br.
Glossodia minor R.Br.
Glyceria fluitans (L.) R.Br.
Gompholobium marginatum R.Br.
Gompholobium polymorphum R.Br.
Gompholobium venustum R.Br.
Gomphrena canescens R.Br.
Gomphrena conica (R.Br.) Spreng.
Gomphrena diffusa (R.Br.) Spreng.
Gomphrena flaccida R.Br.
Gomphrena humilis R.Br.
Gomphrena lanata R.Br.
Goodenia coerulea R.Br.
Goodenia coronopifolia R.Br.
Goodenia cycloptera R.Br.
Goodenia decurrens R.Br.
Goodenia filiformis R.Br.
Goodenia geniculata R.Br.
Goodenia glabra R.Br.
Goodenia gracilis R.Br.
Goodenia hispida R.Br.
Goodenia humilis R.Br.
Goodenia incana R.Br.
Goodenia lanata R.Br.
Goodenia pilosa (R.Br.) Carolin
Goodenia pterigosperma R.Br.
Goodenia pumilio R.Br.
Goodenia purpurascens R.Br.
Goodenia quadrilocularis R.Br.
Goodenia rotundifolia R.Br.
Goodenia scapigera R.Br.
Goodenia stelligera R.Br.
Goodenia varia R.Br.
Goodenia viscida R.Br.
Gratiola pedunculata R.Br.
Gratiola pubescens R.Br.
Grevillea agrifolia A.Cunn. ex R.Br.
Grevillea anethifolia R.Br.
Grevillea angulata R.Br.
Grevillea arenaria R.Br.
Grevillea aspera R.Br.
Grevillea australis R.Br.
Grevillea banksii R.Br.
Grevillea baueri R.Br.
Grevillea baxteri R.Br.
Grevillea bipinnatifida R.Br.
Grevillea buxifolia (Sm.) R.Br.
Grevillea caleyi R.Br.
Grevillea concinna R.Br.
Grevillea crithmifolia R.Br.
Grevillea cunninghamii R.Br.
Grevillea depauperata R.Br.
Grevillea dilatata (R.Br.) Downing
Grevillea divaricata R.Br.
Grevillea dryandri R.Br.
Grevillea fasciculata R.Br.
Grevillea floribunda R.Br.
Grevillea × gaudichaudii R.Br. ex Gaudich.
Grevillea goodii R.Br.
Grevillea heliosperma R.Br.
Grevillea ilicifolia (R.Br.) R.Br.
Grevillea juniperina R.Br.
Grevillea lanigera A.Cunn. ex R.Br.
Grevillea longifolia R.Br.
Grevillea mimosoides R.Br.
Grevillea montana R.Br.
Grevillea mucronulata R.Br.
Grevillea obtusiflora R.Br.
Grevillea occidentalis R.Br.
Grevillea parviflora R.Br.
Grevillea pauciflora R.Br.
Grevillea pectinata R.Br.
Grevillea phylicoides R.Br.
Grevillea pulchella (R.Br.) Meisn.
Grevillea pungens R.Br.
Grevillea pyramidalis A.Cunn. ex R.Br.
Grevillea quercifolia R.Br.
Grevillea refracta R.Br.
Grevillea robusta A.Cunn. ex R.Br.
Grevillea sericea (Sm.) R.Br.
Grevillea sphacelata R.Br.
Grevillea striata R.Br.
Grevillea synapheae R.Br.
Grevillea trifida (R.Br.) Meisn.
Grevillea triternata R.Br.
Grevillea venusta R.Br.
Gymnanthera nitida R.Br.
Gymnema geminatum R.Br.
Gymnoschoenus anceps (R.Br.) C.B.Clarke
Gymnoschoenus sphaerocephalus (R.Br.) Hook.f.
Gymnostachys anceps R.Br.

H

Habenaria elongata R.Br.
Habenaria ochroleuca R.Br.
Haemodorum coccineum R.Br.
Haemodorum laxum R.Br.
Haemodorum planifolium R.Br.
Haemodorum spicatum R.Br.
Hakea adnata R.Br.
Hakea amplexicaulis R.Br.
Hakea arborescens R.Br.
Hakea baxteri R.Br.
Hakea ceratophylla (Sm.) R.Br.
Hakea cinerea R.Br.
Hakea corymbosa R.Br.
Hakea cristata R.Br.
Hakea cucullata R.Br.
Hakea cycloptera R.Br.
Hakea decurrens R.Br.
Hakea denticulata R.Br.
Hakea elliptica (Sm.) R.Br.
Hakea eriantha R.Br.
Hakea falcata R.Br.
Hakea florida R.Br.
Hakea fraseri R.Br.
Hakea ilicifolia R.Br.
Hakea incrassata R.Br.
Hakea lasiantha R.Br.
Hakea lasiocarpha R.Br.
Hakea laurina R.Br.
Hakea leucoptera R.Br.
Hakea linearis R.Br.
Hakea lissocarpha R.Br.
Hakea lissosperma R.Br.
Hakea lorea (R.Br.) R.Br.
Hakea macrocarpa A.Cunn. ex R.Br.
Hakea marginata R.Br.
Hakea microcarpa R.Br.
Hakea nitida R.Br.
Hakea nodosa R.Br.
Hakea obliqua R.Br.
Hakea oleifolia (Sm.) R.Br.
Hakea pandanicarpa R.Br.
Hakea prostrata R.Br.
Hakea rugosa R.Br.
Hakea stenocarpa R.Br.
Hakea stenophylla A.Cunn. ex R.Br.
Hakea sulcata R.Br.
Hakea tephrosperma R.Br.
Hakea trifurcata (Sm.) R.Br.
Hakea tuberculata R.Br.
Hakea ulicina R.Br.
Hakea undulata R.Br.
Hakea varia R.Br.
Hakea vittata R.Br.
Halophila ovalis (R.Br.) Hook.f.
Halophila spinulosa (R.Br.) Asch.
Haloragis stricta R.Br. ex Benth.
Heliotropium asperrimum R.Br.
Heliotropium bracteatum R.Br.
Heliotropium fasciculatum R.Br.
Heliotropium foliatum R.Br.
Heliotropium glabellum R.Br.
Heliotropium paniculatum R.Br.
Heliotropium pauciflorum R.Br.
Heliotropium prostratum R.Br.
Heliotropium tenuifolium R.Br.
Heliotropium ventricosum R.Br.
Hemarthria uncinata R.Br.
Hemiandra pungens R.Br.
Hemichroa diandra R.Br.
Hemichroa pentandra R.Br.
Hemigenia purpurea R.Br.
Heterachne abortiva (R.Br.) Druce
Heteropogon triticeus (R.Br.) Stapf
Hibbertia sericea (R.Br. ex DC.) Benth.
Hierochloe redolens (Vahl) R.Br. ex Roem. & Schult.
Hovea linearis (Sm.) R.Br.
Hovea longifolia R.Br.
Hoya australis R.Br. ex Trail
Hoya carnosa (L.) R.Br.
Huperzia varia (R.Br.) Trevis.
Hydrocotyle hirta R.Br. ex A.Rich.
Hygrophila angustifolia R.Br.
Hymenophyllum rarum R.Br.
Hypoestes floribunda R.Br.
Hypolaena exsulca R.Br.
Hypolaena fastigiata R.Br.
Hypoxis glabella R.Br.
Hypoxis marginata R.Br.
Hypoxis pratensis R.Br.

I

Ipomoea abrupta R.Br.
Ipomoea diversifolia R.Br.
Ipomoea eriocarpa R.Br.
Ipomoea gracilis R.Br.
Ipomoea graminea R.Br.
Ipomoea incisa R.Br.
Ipomoea pes-caprae (L.) R.Br.
Ipomoea plebeia R.Br.
Ipomoea velutina R.Br.
Isachne australis R.Br.
Ischaemum australe R.Br.
Ischaemum fragile R.Br.
Ischaemum triticeum R.Br.
Isolepis cyperoides R.Br.
Isolepis fluitans (L.) R.Br.
Isolepis inundata R.Br.
Isolepis nodosa (Rottb.) R.Br.
Isolepis prolifera (Rottb.) R.Br.
Isolepis setacea (L.) R.Br.
Isopogon asper R.Br.
Isopogon attenuatus R.Br.
Isopogon axillaris R.Br.
Isopogon baxteri R.Br.
Isopogon buxifolius R.Br.
Isopogon ceratophyllus R.Br.
Isopogon cuneatus R.Br.
Isopogon divergens R.Br.
Isopogon dubius (R.Br.) Druce
Isopogon formosus R.Br.
Isopogon latifolius R.Br.
Isopogon longifolius R.Br.
Isopogon petiolaris R.Br.
Isopogon polycephalus R.Br.
Isopogon teretifolius R.Br.
Isopogon trilobus R.Br.
Isopogon uncinatus R.Br.
Isotoma fluviatilis (R.Br.) F.Muell. ex Benth.
Isotoma hypocrateriformis (R.Br.) Druce
Isotoma scapigera (R.Br.) G.Don
Ixiochlamys cuneifolia (R.Br.) Sond.
Ixodia achillaeoides R.Br.

J

Jacksonia spinosa (Labill.) R.Br. ex Sm.
Jasminum aemulum R.Br.
Jasminum molle R.Br.
Johnsonia lupulina R.Br.
Josephinia grandiflora R.Br.
Joycea pallida (R.Br.) Linder
Juncus holoschoenus R.Br.
Juncus pallidus R.Br.
Juncus pauciflorus R.Br.
Juncus planifolius R.Br.
Juncus prismatocarpus R.Br.
Juncus revolutus R.Br.
Juncus vaginatus R.Br.

K

Kailarsenia suffruticosa (R.Br. ex Benth.) Puttock
Kennedia prostrata R.Br.
Kingia australis R.Br.

L

Lablab prostrata R.Br.
Lachnagrostis aemula (R.Br.) Trin.
Lachnagrostis billardierei (R.Br.) Trin.
Lachnagrostis plebeia (R.Br.) Trin.
Lambertia echinata R.Br.
Lambertia ericifolia R.Br.
Lambertia inermis R.Br.
Lambertia uniflora R.Br.
Lasiopetalum rufum R.Br. ex Benth.
Lastreopsis decomposita (R.Br.) Tindale
Lastreopsis tenera (R.Br.) Tindale
Laxmannia gracilis R.Br.
Laxmannia minor R.Br.
Lechenaultia expansa R.Br.
Lechenaultia filiformis R.Br.
Lechenaultia formosa R.Br.
Lechenaultia tubiflora R.Br.
Leichardtia australis R.Br.
Leonotis (Pers.) R.Br.
Leonotis leonurus (L.) R.Br.
Leonotis nepetifolia (L.) R.Br.
Lepidosperma angustatum R.Br.
Lepidosperma aphyllum R.Br.
Lepidosperma concavum R.Br.
Lepidosperma congestum R.Br.
Lepidosperma exaltatum R.Br.
Lepidosperma flexuosum R.Br.
Lepidosperma gracile R.Br.
Lepidosperma laterale R.Br.
Lepidosperma lineare R.Br.
Lepidosperma striatum R.Br.
Lepidosperma viscidum R.Br.
Lepistemon urceolatum (R.Br.) F.Muell.
Leptaspis banksii R.Br.
Leptocarpus tenax (Labill.) R.Br.
Leptoceras menziesii (R.Br.) Lindl.
Leptochloa decipiens (R.Br.) Maiden
Leptochloa digitata (R.Br.) Domin
Leptomeria acida R.Br.
Leptomeria aphylla R.Br.
Leptomeria axillaris R.Br.
Leptomeria pauciflora R.Br.
Leptomeria scrobiculata R.Br.
Leptomeria squarrulosa R.Br.
Leptosema uniflorum (R.Br. ex Benth.) Crisp
Lepturus repens (G.Forst.) R.Br.
Lepyrodia hermaphrodita R.Br.
Lepyrodia scariosa R.Br.
Leucas martinicensis R.Br.
Leucas zeylanica (L.) R.Br.
Leucopogon acuminatus R.Br.
Leucopogon alternifolius R.Br.
Leucopogon amplexicaulis (Rudge) R.Br.
Leucopogon apiculatus R.Br.
Leucopogon appressus R.Br.
Leucopogon assimilis R.Br.
Leucopogon australis R.Br.
Leucopogon biflorus R.Br.
Leucopogon carinatus R.Br.
Leucopogon collinus (Labill.) R.Br.
Leucopogon cucullatus R.Br.
Leucopogon cuspidatus R.Br.
Leucopogon deformis R.Br.
Leucopogon distans R.Br.
Leucopogon ericoides (Sm.) R.Br.
Leucopogon esquamatus R.Br.
Leucopogon flexifolius R.Br.
Leucopogon glabellus R.Br.
Leucopogon gracilis R.Br.
Leucopogon imbricatus R.Br.
Leucopogon interruptus R.Br.
Leucopogon juniperinus R.Br.
Leucopogon lanceolatus (Sm.) R.Br.
Leucopogon leptospermoides R.Br.
Leucopogon margarodes R.Br.
Leucopogon microphyllus (Cav.) R.Br.
Leucopogon montanus (R.Br.) J.H.Willis
Leucopogon multiflorus R.Br.
Leucopogon muticus R.Br.
Leucopogon obovatus (Labill.) R.Br.
Leucopogon pendulus R.Br.
Leucopogon polystachyus R.Br.
Leucopogon propinquus R.Br.
Leucopogon reflexus R.Br.
Leucopogon revolutus R.Br.
Leucopogon rubricaulis R.Br.
Leucopogon ruscifolius R.Br.
Leucopogon setiger R.Br.
Leucopogon striatus R.Br.
Leucopogon tamariscinus R.Br.
Leucopogon verticillatus R.Br.
Leucopogon virgatus (Labill.) R.Br.
Levenhookia pusilla R.Br.
Libertia paniculata (R.Br.) Spreng.
Libertia pulchella (R.Br.) Spreng.
Limonium australe (R.Br.) Kuntze
Limosella australis R.Br.
Lindernia alsinoides R.Br.
Lindernia scapigera R.Br.
Lindernia subulata R.Br.
Lindsaea media R.Br.
Liparis reflexa (R.Br.) Lindl.
Lipocarpha microcephala (R.Br.) Kunth
Lissanthe sapida R.Br.
Lissanthe strigosa (Sm.) R.Br.
Livistona australis (R.Br.) Mart.
Livistona humilis R.Br.
Livistona inermis R.Br.
Lobelia dioica R.Br.
Lobelia membranacea R.Br.
Lobelia quadrangularis R.Br.
Lobelia simplicicaulis R.Br.
Lobelia tenuior R.Br.
Logania campanulata R.Br.
Logania crassifolia R.Br.
Logania fasciculata R.Br.
Logania ovata R.Br.
Logania pusilla R.Br.
Logania serpyllifolia R.Br.
Lomandra banksii (R.Br.) Lauterb.
Lomandra collina (R.Br.) Ewart
Lomandra fluviatilis (R.Br.) A.T.Lee
Lomandra glauca (R.Br.) Ewart
Lomandra gracilis (R.Br.) A.T.Lee
Lomandra hastilis (R.Br.) Ewart
Lomandra hystrix (R.Br.) L.R.Fraser & Vickery
Lomandra laxa (R.Br.) A.T.Lee
Lomandra leucocephala (R.Br.) Ewart
Lomandra montana (R.Br.) L.R.Fraser & Vickery
Lomandra mucronata (R.Br.) A.T.Lee
Lomandra multiflora (R.Br.) A.T.Lee
Lomandra pauciflora (R.Br.) Ewart
Lomatia fraseri R.Br.
Lomatia ilicifolia R.Br.
Lomatia polymorpha R.Br.
Lomatia silaifolia (Sm.) R.Br.
Lomatia tinctoria (Labill.) R.Br.
Lophostemon confertus (R.Br.) Peter G.Wilson & J.T.Waterh.
Loxocarya cinerea R.Br.
Loxocarya pubescens (R.Br.) Benth.
Lycopodiella diffusa (R.Br.) B.Ollg.
Lycopodiella lateralis (R.Br.) B.Ollg.
Lycopodium fastigiatum R.Br.
Lycopus australis R.Br.
Lyginia barbata R.Br.
Lygodium microphyllum (Cav.) R.Br.
Lyperanthus suaveolens R.Br.
Lysinema ciliatum R.Br.
Lysinema conspicuum R.Br.
Lysinema lasianthum R.Br.

M

Maireana aphylla (R.Br.) Paul G.Wilson
Maireana brevifolia (R.Br.) Paul G.Wilson
Marsdenia australis (R.Br.) Druce
Marsdenia cinerascens R.Br.
Marsdenia geminata (R.Br.) P.I.Forst.
Marsdenia rostrata R.Br.
Marsdenia suaveolens R.Br.
Marsdenia trinervis (R.Br.) P.I.Forst.
Marsdenia velutina R.Br.
Marsdenia viridiflora R.Br.
Marsilea angustifolia R.Br.
Marsilea hirsuta R.Br.
Mazus pumilio R.Br.
Mecopodum striatum (R.Br.) D.L.Jones & M.A.Clem.
Meeboldina scariosa (R.Br.) B.G.Briggs & L.A.S.Johnson
Melaleuca calycina R.Br.
Melaleuca decussata R.Br.
Melaleuca densa R.Br.
Melaleuca fulgens R.Br.
Melaleuca globifera R.Br.
Melaleuca incana R.Br.
Melaleuca pulchella R.Br.
Melaleuca scabra R.Br.
Melaleuca uncinata R.Br.
Melichrus urceolatus R.Br.
Melicytus dentatus (R.Br. ex DC.) Molloy & Mabb.
Mentha australis R.Br.
Mentha satureioides R.Br.
Merremia quinata (R.Br.) Ooststr.
Mesomelaena stygia (R.Br.) Nees
Mesomelaena tetragona (R.Br.) Benth.
Microcorys barbata R.Br.
Microcorys purpurea R.Br.
Microcorys virgata R.Br.
Microlaena stipoides (Labill.) R.Br.
Microsorum membranifolium (R.Br.) Ching
Microtis alba R.Br.
Microtis media R.Br.
Microtis parviflora R.Br.
Microtis pulchella R.Br.
Microtis rara R.Br.
Mimulus gracilis R.Br.
Mimulus repens R.Br.
Mirbelia dilatata R.Br. ex Dryand.
Mitrasacme alsinoides R.Br.
Mitrasacme ambigua R.Br.
Mitrasacme connata R.Br.
Mitrasacme elata R.Br.
Mitrasacme laricifolia R.Br.
Mitrasacme multicaulis R.Br.
Mitrasacme paludosa R.Br.
Mitrasacme phascoides R.Br.
Mitrasacme polymorpha R.Br.
Mitrasacme prolifera R.Br.
Mitrasacme pygmaea R.Br.
Mitrasacme serpyllifolia R.Br.
Mitrasacme stellata R.Br.
Mnesithea formosa (R.Br.) de Koning & Sosef
Mnesithea rottboellioides (R.Br.) de Koning & Sosef
Monotoca elliptica (Sm.) R.Br.
Monotoca empetrifolia R.Br.
Monotoca scoparia (Sm.) R.Br.
Murdannia graminea (R.Br.) G.Bruckn.
Myoporum acuminatum R.Br.
Myoporum insulare R.Br.
Myoporum montanum R.Br.
Myoporum oppositifolium R.Br.
Myoporum parvifolium R.Br.
Myoporum platycarpum R.Br.
Myoporum viscosum R.Br.
Myosotis australis R.Br.
Myristica insipida R.Br.
Myrsine variabilis R.Br.

N

Najas tenuifolia R.Br.
Nasturtium officinale R.Br.
Needhamiella pumilio (R.Br.) L.Watson
Nelsonia campestris R.Br.
Nemacianthus caudatus (R.Br.) D.L.Jones & M.A.Clem.
Neolitsea dealbata (R.Br.) Merr.
Nephrolepis obliterata (R.Br.) J.Sm.
Neurachne alopecuroides R.Br.
Notelaea microcarpa R.Br.
Notelaea ovata R.Br.
Notelaea punctata R.Br.
Notodanthonia longifolia (R.Br.) Veldkamp
Nuytsia floribunda (Labill.) R.Br.
Nymphoides geminata (R.Br.) Kuntze
Nyssanthes diffusa R.Br.
Nyssanthes erecta R.Br.

O

Olax aphylla R.Br.
Olax phyllanthi (Labill.) R.Br.
Olax stricta R.Br.
Olea paniculata R.Br.
Oligarrhena micrantha R.Br.
Oligochaetochilus rufus (R.Br.) Szlach.
Oligochaetochilus squamatus (R.Br.) Szlach.
Omphacomeria acerba (R.Br.) A.DC.
Ophioglossum costatum R.Br.
Oplismenus aemulus (R.Br.) Roem. & Schult.
Oreobolus pumilio R.Br.
Orites acicularis (R.Br.) Roem. & Schult.
Orites diversifolius R.Br.
Orites excelsus R.Br.
Orites revolutus R.Br.
Orthoceras strictum R.Br.
Ottelia ovalifolia (R.Br.) Rich.
Ourisia integrifolia R.Br.
Oxylobium arborescens R.Br.
Oxylobium ellipticum (Vent.) R.Br.

P

Pachynema complanatum R.Br. ex DC.
Pandanus pedunculatus R.Br.
Pandanus spiralis R.Br.
Panicum decompositum R.Br.
Panicum effusum R.Br.
Panicum pygmaeum R.Br.
Paracaleana minor (R.Br.) Blaxell
Parahebe formosa (R.Br.) Heads
Parahebe perfoliata (R.Br.) B.G.Briggs & Ehrend.
Parsonsia lanceolata R.Br.
Parsonsia straminea (R.Br.) F.Muell.
Parsonsia velutina R.Br.
Paspalidium gracile (R.Br.) Hughes
Patersonia glabrata R.Br.
Patersonia lanata R.Br.
Patersonia longifolia R.Br.
Patersonia occidentalis R.Br.
Patersonia sericea R.Br.
Pellaea falcata (R.Br.) Fee
Pellaea paradoxa (R.Br.) Hook.
Pennisetum glaucum (L.) R.Br.
Pennisetum villosum R.Br. ex Fresen.
Pentachondra involucrata R.Br.
Pentachondra pumila (J.R.Forst. & G.Forst.) R.Br.
Perotis rara R.Br.
Persicaria attenuata (R.Br.) Sojak
Persicaria decipiens (R.Br.) K.L.Wilson
Persicaria elatior (R.Br.) Sojak
Persicaria prostrata (R.Br.) Sojak
Persicaria strigosa (R.Br.) H.Gross
Persicaria subsessilis (R.Br.) K.L.Wilson
Persoonia attenuata R.Br.
Persoonia cornifolia A.Cunn. ex R.Br.
Persoonia curvifolia R.Br.
Persoonia daphnoides A.Cunn. ex R.Br.
Persoonia elliptica R.Br.
Persoonia falcata R.Br.
Persoonia fastigiata R.Br.
Persoonia flexifolia R.Br.
Persoonia graminea R.Br.
Persoonia longifolia R.Br.
Persoonia marginata A.Cunn. ex R.Br.
Persoonia media R.Br.
Persoonia microcarpa R.Br.
Persoonia microphylla R.Br.
Persoonia mollis R.Br.
Persoonia nutans R.Br.
Persoonia oblongata R.Br.
Persoonia pinifolia R.Br.
Persoonia prostrata R.Br.
Persoonia rigida R.Br.
Persoonia saccata R.Br.
Persoonia scabra R.Br.
Persoonia sericea A.Cunn. ex R.Br.
Persoonia spathulata R.Br.
Persoonia striata R.Br.
Persoonia tenuifolia R.Br.
Persoonia teretifolia R.Br.
Persoonia virgata R.Br.
Petalochilus alatus (R.Br.) D.L.Jones & M.A.Clem.
Petalostylis labicheoides R.Br.
Petrophile acicularis R.Br.
Petrophile anceps R.Br.
Petrophile biloba R.Br.
Petrophile canescens A.Cunn. ex R.Br.
Petrophile crispata R.Br.
Petrophile divaricata R.Br.
Petrophile diversifolia R.Br.
Petrophile ericifolia R.Br.
Petrophile fastigiata R.Br.
Petrophile linearis R.Br.
Petrophile longifolia R.Br.
Petrophile macrostachya R.Br.
Petrophile media R.Br.
Petrophile pedunculata R.Br.
Petrophile phylicoides R.Br.
Petrophile pulchella (Schrad. & J.C.Wendl.) R.Br.
Petrophile rigida R.Br.
Petrophile serruriae R.Br.
Petrophile squamata R.Br.
Petrophile striata R.Br.
Petrophile teretifolia R.Br.
Philydrella pygmaea (R.Br.) Caruel
Phlebocarya ciliata R.Br.
Phyllangium paradoxum (R.Br.) Dunlop
Pimelea angustifolia R.Br.
Pimelea argentea R.Br.
Pimelea cinerea R.Br.
Pimelea glauca R.Br.
Pimelea hispida R.Br.
Pimelea humilis R.Br.
Pimelea lanata R.Br.
Pimelea octophylla R.Br.
Pimelea pauciflora R.Br.
Pimelea rosea R.Br.
Pimelea sericea R.Br.
Pimelea spicata R.Br.
Pimelea sylvestris R.Br.
Pisonia grandis R.Br.
Pityrodia salviifolia R.Br.
Planchonella australis (R.Br.) Pierre
Planchonella obovata (R.Br.) Pierre
Plantago debilis R.Br.
Plantago hispida R.Br.
Plantago varia R.Br.
Platylobium triangulare R.Br.
Platyzoma microphyllum R.Br.
Plectranthus congestus R.Br.
Plectranthus scutellarioides (L.) R.Br.
Pleurosorus rutifolius (R.Br.) Fee
Plinthanthesis paradoxa (R.Br.) S.T.Blake
Poa affinis R.Br.
Poa saxicola R.Br.
Podocarpus elatus R.Br. ex Endl.
Podocarpus spinulosus (Sm.) R.Br. ex Mirb.
Pollia crispata (R.Br.) Benth.
Pollia macrophylla (R.Br.) Benth.
Polygonum lanigerum R.Br.
Polygonum plebeium R.Br.
Polymeria ambigua R.Br.
Polymeria calycina R.Br.
Polymeria pusilla R.Br.
Polypogon tenellus R.Br.
Polystichum proliferum (R.Br.) C.Presl
Potamophila parviflora R.Br.
Pouteria australis (R.Br.) Baehni
Pouteria obovata (R.Br.) Baehni
Prasophyllum australe R.Br.
Prasophyllum elatum R.Br.
Prasophyllum fimbriatum R.Br.
Prasophyllum flavum R.Br.
Prasophyllum fuscum R.Br.
Prasophyllum macrostachyum R.Br.
Prasophyllum nigricans R.Br.
Prasophyllum patens R.Br.
Prasophyllum rufum R.Br.
Pratia concolor (R.Br.) Druce
Pratia irrigua (R.Br.) Benth.
Pratia pedunculata (R.Br.) Benth.
Pratia purpurascens (R.Br.) E.Wimm.
Premna acuminata R.Br.
Prionotes cerinthoides (Labill.) R.Br.
Proiphys alba (R.Br.) Mabb.
Prostanthera caerulea R.Br.
Prostanthera denticulata R.Br.
Prostanthera incisa R.Br.
Prostanthera linearis R.Br.
Prostanthera marifolia R.Br.
Prostanthera ovalifolia R.Br.
Prostanthera prunelloides R.Br.
Prostanthera rhombea R.Br.
Prostanthera rotundifolia R.Br.
Prostanthera saxicola R.Br.
Prostanthera scutellarioides (R.Br.) Briq.
Prostanthera serpyllifolia (R.Br.) Briq.
Prostanthera violacea R.Br.
Pseuderanthemum variabile (R.Br.) Radlk.
Pseudopogonatherum irritans (R.Br.) A.Camus
Pseudoraphis abortiva (R.Br.) Pilg.
Pseudoraphis paradoxa (R.Br.) Pilg.
Pseudoraphis spinescens (R.Br.) Vickery
Psydrax attenuata (R.Br. ex Benth.) S.T.Reynolds & R.J.F.Hend.
Psydrax attenuata (R.Br. ex Benth.) S.T.Reynolds & R.J.F.Hend. f. myrmecophila
Pteris tremula R.Br.
Pteris umbrosa R.Br.
Pterostylis acuminata R.Br.
Pterostylis concinna R.Br.
Pterostylis cucullata R.Br.
Pterostylis curta R.Br.
Pterostylis dubia R.Br.
Pterostylis gibbosa R.Br.
Pterostylis grandiflora R.Br.
Pterostylis longifolia R.Br.
Pterostylis mutica R.Br.
Pterostylis nana R.Br.
Pterostylis nutans R.Br.
Pterostylis ophioglossa R.Br.
Pterostylis parviflora R.Br.
Pterostylis pedunculata R.Br.
Pterostylis reflexa R.Br.
Pterostylis revoluta R.Br.
Ptilanthelium deustum (R.Br.) Kuk.
Ptilothrix deusta (R.Br.) K.L.Wilson
Ptilotus conicus R.Br.
Ptilotus corymbosus R.Br.
Ptilotus distans (R.Br.) Poir.
Ptilotus fusiformis (R.Br.) Poir.
Ptilotus incanus (R.Br.) Poir.
Ptilotus latifolius R.Br.
Ptilotus macrocephalus (R.Br.) Poir.
Ptilotus spathulatus (R.Br.) Poir.
Ptilotus spathulatus (R.Br.) Poir. f. spathulatus
Ptychosperma elegans (R.Br.) Blume
Pultenaea acerosa R.Br. ex Benth.
Pultenaea scabra R.Br.
Pultenaea tenuifolia R.Br. & Sims
Pultenaea vestita R.Br.
Pultenaea viscosa R.Br. ex Benth.
Pyrorchis nigricans (R.Br.) D.L.Jones & M.A.Clem.
Pyrrosia confluens (R.Br.) Ching
Pyrrosia rupestris (R.Br.) Ching

R

Ranunculus inundatus R.Br. ex DC.
Ranunculus pumilio R.Br. ex DC.
Ranunculus sessiliflorus R.Br. ex DC.
Rapanea urceolata (R.Br.) Mez
Rhagodia crassifolia R.Br.
Rhagodia parabolica R.Br.
Rhagodia spinescens R.Br.
Rhynchospora longisetis R.Br.
Richea dracophylla R.Br.
Richea sprengelioides (R.Br.) F.Muell.
Rimacola elliptica (R.Br.) Rupp
Ripogonum album R.Br.
Rostellularia adscendens (R.Br.) R.M.Barker
Rumex bidens R.Br.
Rytidosperma pauciflorum (R.Br.) Connor & Edgar

S

Sacciolepis myosuroides (R.Br.) A.Camus
Salvia plebeia R.Br.
Samolus junceus R.Br.
Santalum acuminatum (R.Br.) A.DC.
Santalum lanceolatum R.Br.
Santalum obtusifolium R.Br.
Santalum spicatum (R.Br.) A.DC.
Sarcochilus falcatus R.Br.
Sarcostemma australe R.Br.
Sarcostemma viminale (L.) R.Br.
Sarga plumosum (R.Br.) Spangler
Scaevola aemula R.Br.
Scaevola angulata R.Br.
Scaevola depauperata R.Br.
Scaevola humilis R.Br.
Scaevola linearis R.Br.
Scaevola nitida R.Br.
Scaevola ovalifolia R.Br.
Scaevola paludosa R.Br.
Scaevola revoluta R.Br.
Scaevola spinescens R.Br.
Scaevola striata R.Br.
Schelhammera multiflora R.Br.
Schelhammera undulata R.Br.
Schizachyrium fragile (R.Br.) A.Camus
Schizaea rupestris R.Br.
Schoenus acuminatus R.Br.
Schoenus brevifolius R.Br.
Schoenus brevisetis (R.Br.) Roem. & Schult.
Schoenus curvifolius (R.Br.) Poir. ex Roem. & Schult.
Schoenus ericetorum R.Br.
Schoenus falcatus R.Br.
Schoenus imberbis R.Br.
Schoenus melanostachys R.Br.
Schoenus punctatus R.Br.
Schoenus sparteus R.Br.
Schoenus villosus R.Br.
Scirpus plumosus R.Br.
Scleranthus diander R.Br.
Scleranthus pungens R.Br.
Scleria caricina (R.Br.) Benth.
Scleria laxa R.Br.
Scleria pygmaea R.Br.
Scleria rugosa R.Br.
Sclerolaena divaricata (R.Br.) Sm.
Sclerolaena uniflora R.Br.
Sclerostegia arbuscula (R.Br.) Paul G.Wilson
Scutellaria humilis R.Br.
Scutellaria mollis R.Br.
Sebaea ovata (Labill.) R.Br.
Secamone elliptica R.Br.
Setaria rara (R.Br.) R.D.Webster
Smilax australis R.Br.
Solanum campanulatum R.Br.
Solanum cinereum R.Br.
Solanum discolor R.Br.
Solanum echinatum R.Br.
Solanum ellipticum R.Br.
Solanum furfuraceum R.Br.
Solanum hystrix R.Br.
Solanum parvifolium R.Br.
Solanum pungetium R.Br.
Solanum tetrandrum R.Br.
Soliva stolonifera (Brot.) R.Br. ex G.Don
Sorghum plumosum (R.Br.) P.Beauv.
Sphaerolobium medium R.Br.
Sphenotoma capitata (R.Br.) Lindl.
Sphenotoma gracilis (R.Br.) Sweet
Sphenotoma squarrosa (R.Br.) G.Don
Spinifex longifolius R.Br.
Spinifex sericeus R.Br.
Sporadanthus gracilis (R.Br.) B.G.Briggs & L.A.S.Johnson
Sporadanthus strictus (R.Br.) B.G.Briggs & L.A.S.Johnson
Sporobolus elongatus R.Br.
Sporobolus indicus (L.) R.Br.
Sporobolus pulchellus R.Br.
Sprengelia montana R.Br.
Sprengelia sprengelioides (R.Br.) Druce
Stemodia pubescens (R.Br.) W.R.Barker
Stemona lucida (R.Br.) Duyfjes
Stenocarpus cunninghamii R.Br.
Stenocarpus salignus R.Br.
Stenopetalum lineare R.Br. ex DC.
Sterculia quadrifida R.Br.
Sticherus flabellatus (R.Br.) H.St.John
Sticherus tener (R.Br.) Ching
Stirlingia anethifolia (R.Br.) Endl.
Stirlingia latifolia (R.Br.) Steud.
Stirlingia tenuifolia (R.Br.) Steud.
Striga curviflora (R.Br.) Benth.
Striga parviflora (R.Br.) Benth.
Strychnos lucida R.Br.
Stylidium adnatum R.Br.
Stylidium alsinoides R.Br.
Stylidium amoenum R.Br.
Stylidium articulatum R.Br.
Stylidium assimile R.Br.
Stylidium breviscapum R.Br.
Stylidium caespitosum R.Br.
Stylidium calcaratum R.Br.
Stylidium capillare R.Br.
Stylidium corymbosum R.Br.
Stylidium crassifolium R.Br.
Stylidium despectum R.Br.
Stylidium diversifolium R.Br.
Stylidium eriorhizum R.Br.
Stylidium falcatum R.Br.
Stylidium fasciculatum R.Br.
Stylidium floribundum R.Br.
Stylidium guttatum R.Br.
Stylidium hirsutum R.Br.
Stylidium inundatum R.Br.
Stylidium junceum R.Br.
Stylidium luteum R.Br.
Stylidium pedunculatum R.Br.
Stylidium piliferum R.Br.
Stylidium pygmaeum R.Br.
Stylidium repens R.Br.
Stylidium rotundifolium R.Br.
Stylidium scandens R.Br.
Stylidium spathulatum R.Br.
Stylidium spinulosum R.Br.
Stylidium violaceum R.Br.
Stypandra glauca R.Br.
Styphelia adscendens R.Br.
Styphelia laeta R.Br.
Styphelia longifolia R.Br.
Suaeda australis (R.Br.) Moq.
Sutherlandia frutescens (L.) R.Br. ex W.T.Aiton
Swainsona galegifolia (Andrews) R.Br.
Swainsona laxa R.Br.
Symphionema montanum R.Br.
Symphionema paludosum R.Br.
Synaphea favosa R.Br.
Synaphea petiolaris R.Br.
Synaphea polymorpha R.Br.

T

Tabernaemontana orientalis R.Br.
Tasmannia insipida R.Br. ex DC.
Telopea speciosissima (Sm.) R.Br.
Telopea truncata (Labill.) R.Br.
Templetonia retusa (Vent.) R.Br.
Tephrosia astragaloides R.Br. ex Benth.
Tephrosia juncea R.Br. ex Benth.
Tephrosia oblongata R.Br. ex Benth.
Tephrosia porrecta R.Br. ex Benth.
Tephrosia reticulata R.Br. ex Benth.
Tetrameles nudiflora R.Br.
Tetrarrhena acuminata R.Br.
Tetrarrhena distichophylla (Labill.) R.Br.
Tetrarrhena juncea R.Br.
Tetrarrhena laevis R.Br.
Teucrium argutum R.Br.
Teucrium corymbosum R.Br.
Teucrium racemosum R.Br.
Thecanthes punicea (R.Br.) Wikstr.
Thelionema caespitosum (R.Br.) R.J.F.Hend.
Thelionema umbellatum (R.Br.) R.J.F.Hend.
Thelymitra angustifolia R.Br.
Thelymitra canaliculata R.Br.
Thelymitra carnea R.Br.
Thelymitra fuscolutea R.Br.
Thelymitra media R.Br.
Thelymitra nuda R.Br.
Thelymitra pauciflora R.Br.
Thelymitra tigrina R.Br.
Thelymitra venosa R.Br.
Thesium australe R.Br.
Threlkeldia diffusa R.Br.
Thuarea involuta (G.Forst.) R.Br. ex Sm.
Thysanotus banksii R.Br.
Thysanotus baueri R.Br.
Thysanotus dichotomus (Labill.) R.Br.
Thysanotus gracilis R.Br.
Thysanotus isantherus R.Br.
Thysanotus multiflorus R.Br.
Thysanotus patersonii R.Br.
Thysanotus pauciflorus R.Br.
Thysanotus sparteus R.Br.
Thysanotus triandrus (Labill.) R.Br.
Thysanotus tuberosus R.Br.
Tmesipteris truncata (R.Br.) Desv.
Tremandra stelligera R.Br.
Tremulina tremula (R.Br.) B.G.Briggs & L.A.S.Johnson
Tribulopis angustifolia R.Br.
Tribulopis pentandra R.Br.
Tribulopis solandri R.Br.
Tribulus hystrix R.Br.
Tribulus occidentalis R.Br.
Trichodesma zeylanicum R.Br.
Tricoryne anceps R.Br.
Tricoryne elatior R.Br.
Tricoryne simplex R.Br.
Tricoryne tenella R.Br.
Triglochin mucronatum R.Br.
Triglochin procerum R.Br.
Triodia irritans R.Br.
Triodia microstachya R.Br.
Triodia procera R.Br.
Triodia pungens R.Br.
Triraphis mollis R.Br.
Tristania neriifolia (Sims) R.Br.
Triumfetta denticulata R.Br. ex Benth.
Trochocarpa laurina (Rudge) R.Br.
Trochocarpa thymifolia (R.Br.) Spreng.
Tropilis aemula (R.Br.) Raf.
Tylophora barbata R.Br. (synonym of Vincetoxicum barbatum)
Tylophora cinerascens (R.Br.) P.I.Forst.
Tylophora flexuosa R.Br.
Tylophora grandiflora R.Br.
Tylophora paniculata R.Br.

U

Uncinia compacta R.Br.
Uncinia riparia R.Br.
Uncinia tenella R.Br.
Urochloa foliosa (R.Br.) R.D.Webster
Urochloa holosericea (R.Br.) R.D.Webster
Urochloa polyphylla (R.Br.) R.D.Webster
Utricularia albiflora R.Br.
Utricularia australis R.Br.
Utricularia barbata R.Br.
Utricularia baueri R.Br.
Utricularia biloba R.Br.
Utricularia chrysantha R.Br.
Utricularia cyanea R.Br.
Utricularia exoleta R.Br.
Utricularia lateriflora R.Br.
Utricularia limosa R.Br.
Utricularia menziesii R.Br.
Utricularia simplex R.Br.
Utricularia tenella R.Br.
Utricularia violacea R.Br.
Utricularia volubilis R.Br.

V

Vallisneria nana R.Br.
Velleia arguta R.Br.
Velleia lyrata R.Br.
Velleia paradoxa R.Br.
Velleia perfoliata R.Br.
Velleia pubescens R.Br.
Velleia spathulata R.Br.
Veronica arguta R.Br.
Veronica calycina R.Br.
Veronica distans R.Br.
Veronica gracilis R.Br.
Veronica plebeia R.Br.
Vetiveria elongata (R.Br.) Stapf ex C.E.Hubb.
Villarsia parnassiifolia (Labill.) R.Br.
Villarsia reniformis R.Br.
Vitex acuminata R.Br.
Vitex glabrata R.Br.

W

Wahlenbergia quadrifida (R.Br.) A.DC.
Wahlenbergia saxicola (R.Br.) A.DC.
Wahlenbergia stricta (R.Br.) Sweet
Westringia angustifolia R.Br.
Westringia dampieri R.Br.
Westringia glabra R.Br.
Westringia longifolia R.Br.
Westringia rigida R.Br.
Westringia rubiifolia R.Br.
Whiteochloa airoides (R.Br.) Lazarides
Wilsonia humilis R.Br.
Wrightia pubescens R.Br.
Wrightia saligna (R.Br.) F.Muell. ex Benth.
Wurmbea biglandulosa (R.Br.) T.D.Macfarl.
Wurmbea dioica (R.Br.) F.Muell.
Wurmbea uniflora (R.Br.) T.D.Macfarl.

X

Xanthorrhoea arborea R.Br.
Xanthorrhoea australis R.Br.
Xanthorrhoea bracteata R.Br.
Xanthorrhoea media R.Br.
Xanthorrhoea minor R.Br.
Xanthorrhoea pumilio R.Br.
Xerochloa barbata R.Br.
Xerochloa imberbis R.Br.
Xylomelum occidentale R.Br.
Xyris complanata R.Br.
Xyris flexifolia R.Br.
Xyris gracilis R.Br.
Xyris juncea R.Br.
Xyris lacera R.Br.
Xyris lanata R.Br.

Y

Yakirra pauciflora (R.Br.) Lazarides & R.D.Webster

Z

Zieria furfuracea R.Br. ex Benth.
Zieria involucrata R.Br. ex Benth.
Zygochloa paradoxa (R.Br.) S.T.Blake

See also 
 Brown's taxonomic arrangement of Banksia

Described by Brown, Robert
Robert Brown (botanist, born 1773)